Tobi Pelly (born 1958) is a Sudanese boxer. He competed at the 1984 Summer Olympics and the 1988 Summer Olympics. At the 1984 Summer Olympics, he lost to Paul Fitzgerald of Ireland.

References

1958 births
Living people
Featherweight boxers
Lightweight boxers
Sudanese male boxers
Olympic boxers of Sudan
Boxers at the 1984 Summer Olympics
Boxers at the 1988 Summer Olympics
Place of birth missing (living people)